Adrien Louis Demont (25 October 1851, Douai - 25 October 1928, Wissant) was a French landscape painter; associated with the artists' colony at Wissant.

Biography 
At first, he studied law, but decided to devote himself to painting. His first lessons were in his hometown. Later, he collaborated with Émile Breton. In 1871, he met Jean-Baptiste Corot during his visit to Douai and, shortly after, went to Paris, where he found a position in the workshops of Joseph Blanc.

In 1880, he married the daughter of the painter, Jules Breton, who would herself become a well-known painter under the name Virginie Demont-Breton. Originally, the couple settled in Montgeron but, the following year, they discovered the village of Wissant on the Côte d'Opale. That is where they chose to settle and, in 1891, built a villa in the Egyptian Revival style that they named the "Typhonium".

They met together frequently until the beginning of World War I. In 1905, Demont was elected a member of "Rosati", a goguette located in Arras. The following year, he was named a Knight in the Legion of Honour.

The year before his death, he published a book of memoirs called Souvenances. Promenades à travers ma vie, describing everyday life and the artistic milieu in Northern France.

His works are preserved at small museums throughout the region, as well as at the Palais des Beaux-Arts de Lille.

References

Further reading 
 Émile Poiteau. Ceux de chez nous. Adrien Demont et Virginie Demont-Breton, Arras, 1925.
 Virginie Demont-Breton. Les maisons que j'ai connues, 4 volumes, 1926-1930
 Michèle Moyne-Charlet, Anne Esnault, Annette Bourrut Lacouture, Yann Gobert-Sergent, Visages de Terre et de Mer - Regards de peintres à Wissant à la fin du 19e siècle, Éditions du Pas-de-Calais, SilvanaEditoriale, 2014, .
 Annette Bourrut Lacouture, Egyptomanie fin de siecle : Le Typhonium, de meure des peintres Adrien Demont et Virginie Demont-Breton, F. de Nobele, 1990

External links 

1851 births
1928 deaths
19th-century French painters
20th-century French painters
20th-century French male artists
Recipients of the Legion of Honour
People from Douai
French landscape painters
19th-century French male artists